James Robert Miller (born July 24, 1949) is a former National Football League (NFL) offensive guard who played five seasons (1971-1975) with the Atlanta Falcons. In the 1974 NFL season, Miller started 13 of the 14 games as the left guard. He later developed injuries that forced early retirement. He came out of retirement and spent part of the 1976 season with the Green Bay Packers before injuries ended his active playing career. Jim returned to the Falcons as a talent scout for another 3 years then moved back to Iowa to begin a real estate development career. He played college football for the 
University of Iowa Hawkeyes as an offensive tackle. He was a two sport(basketball and football) All-State athlete for Regina High School in Iowa City, Iowa.

References

External links
Just Sports Stats

Living people
1949 births
Players of American football from Iowa
American football offensive guards
Iowa Hawkeyes football players
Atlanta Falcons players
Sportspeople from Iowa City, Iowa